Limnell is a surname, likely of Swedish origin. Notable people with the surname include:

Emanuel Limnell (1766-1861), Swedish decorative painter and watercolorist
Fredrika Limnell (1816-1897), Swedish philanthropist, mecenate, feminist, and salonist